Mikhail Veniaminovich Davydov (born 2 July 1972) is a former Russian football player.

Honours
Gornyak
Kazakhstan Premier League bronze: 1993

References

1972 births
Living people
Soviet footballers
FC FShM Torpedo Moscow players
FC Volgar Astrakhan players
Russian footballers
Russian expatriate footballers
Expatriate footballers in Kazakhstan
FC Lokomotiv Nizhny Novgorod players
FC Torpedo NN Nizhny Novgorod players
FC Mordovia Saransk players
Russian Premier League players
Kazakhstan Premier League players
Association football defenders
FC Neftekhimik Nizhnekamsk players